Francisco Fluxá Ginart (15 November 1933 − 10 February 2016) was a Chilean football leader who served as president of Unión Española and the Chilean Football Association, then called Asociación Central del Fútbol (ACF).

His period in the ACF is regarded for the qualification of Chile to the 1974 FIFA World Cup and for the political problems amid the 1973 coup d'état led by general Augusto Pinochet. Similarly, according to the journalist Daniel Matamala, Fluxá was a fierce supporter of president Eduardo Frei Montalva (1964−1970) and his party, the Christian Democracy.

References

Further reading

External links
 Profile at Geni

1933 births
2016 deaths
Chilean people
Chilean people of Catalan descent
Unión Española chairmen and investors
Presidents of the ANFP